Kameisha Jerae Hodge (pronounced /kəmiːʃə dʒɛreɪ hɒdʒ/; born November 1, 1989) is an American writer, publisher, poet, and spoken word artist from Washington, D.C. She is the founder and CEO of Sovereign Noir Publications, a publishing company established in 2019 that elevates Black women's voices.

Early life
Hodge was born in 1989 in Washington, D.C., the oldest of eleven, and she, a brother, and a sister were raised by their mother Sabrina. For a while, they were homeless, staying with relatives or at homeless shelters.

Hodge began reading in poetry competitions while in middle school. In tenth grade, she met her mentor, Yolanda D. Coleman-Body, who introduced her to journalism, publishing, and writing and taught her how to "exist in the industry as a Black girl". Coleman-Body encouraged Hodge to write for Rated-T, the school magazine; Hodge became a reporter, writer, and editor. She also served as the Editor-in-Chief of Knight Vision, the school newspaper. She graduated from Friendship Collegiate Academy Public Charter School in 2007.

Hodge attended Lafayette College as a Posse Scholar and English and Africana major and quickly became involved with campus life.

She served as the VP of Writing Organization Reaching Dynamic Students, a student arts group; performed at mic nights and poetry slams; started Lafayette's step team; was resident of the Association of Black Collegians; co-hosted a radio show with DJ Spyda Da Don; and oversaw the African-Caribbean interest floor in her dorm. She also interned at MTV's development department for The N during her summer break. While there, she was a live audience member for Total Request Live and in the pilot episode of Dance or Drop, a proposed MTV show. She graduated from Lafayette in 2012 with a BA in English and moved on to pursue an MA in English and creative writing with a concentration in poetry from Southern New Hampshire University.

She also has a certificate in publishing.

Career
Hodge self-published her first poetry collection, Atlas of Consciousness, in 2010 while still a student at Lafayette. Since then, two more collections have been published: Double Consciousness: An Autoethnic Guide to My Black American Experience (July 2014) and Woman. Queer. Black. (November 2021). She has been a #1 bestselling author on Amazon, is published in the Georgetown Journal of Law & Modern Critical Race Perspectives, and was a TEDx speaker at Lafayette College. She has also worked with Martha's Table, NPR, WAMU, UrRepublic, and Viacom.

Hodge founded Sovereign Noir Publications, a publisher focused on elevating Black women writers, in 2019. She and high school classmate Charles Smith founded i2Kings1Queen Publishing. She is also a mentor for the First Ladies of Poverty Foundation.

Personal life
Hodge is a lesbian.

Awards and honors

References

External links 
Hodge's Official Website (archive)

1989 births
Living people
Lafayette College alumni
Southern New Hampshire University alumni
American lesbian writers
African-American poets
African-American publishers (people)
American editors
American women poets
21st-century American poets
Poets from Washington, D.C.
People from Washington, D.C.
American LGBT poets
21st-century African-American writers
21st-century African-American women writers
21st-century American women writers
20th-century African-American people
20th-century African-American women